The National Cherry Festival is a food festival in Traverse City, Michigan. It began in 1925 as the Blessing of the Blossoms Festival, which was held in early May to attract tourists to Northern Michigan to view the blooming cherry blossoms. In 1931 the Michigan Legislature renamed the festival the National Cherry Festival, and moved the event to the summer.

History 
The first cherry trees in the region were planted on the Old Mission Peninsula in 1852 by Rev. Peter Dougherty. Commercial orchard production of cherries began in 1893 near Old Mission. The very first festival was held in May 1925, and was known as the Blessing of the Blossoms. The first cherry queen was Gertrude Brown. In 1931, the Michigan Legislature renamed the festival to the National Cherry Festival, and moved to July. The festival was cancelled from 1942 to 1947 due to World War II.

In 1975, President Gerald Ford, a Michigan native, attended the festival, and led the Cherry Royale Parade as Grand Marshal.

On July 25, 1987, Cherry Festival participants earned a place in the Guinness Book of World Records for baking the world's largest cherry pie. This replaced the pie baked nine years earlier in Charlevoix, Michigan. This record was held until July 14, 1990, when a pie weighing ,  in diameter was baked and eaten by approximately 1500 people in Oliver, British Columbia.

In 2020, Festival Officials announced on Thursday, April 16, 2020, that the 90th National Cherry Festival was to be postponed until the following year. This postponement was in light of global health concerns regarding the COVID-19 pandemic.

See also
Cherry production in Michigan
Michigan wine

References

External links
 National Cherry Festival
 World's Largest Cherry Pie Pan
 Airshow

Food and drink festivals in the United States
Festivals in Michigan
Traverse City, Michigan
Tourist attractions in Grand Traverse County, Michigan
1925 establishments in Michigan
Fruit festivals